Skyfall is a 2012 spy film based on the Ian Fleming character James Bond, produced by Eon Productions and distributed by Sony Pictures Releasing. It is the twenty-third Eon-produced James Bond film. Directed by Sam Mendes and written by Neal Purvis, Robert Wade, and John Logan, it stars Daniel Craig as Bond, alongside Javier Bardem, Ralph Fiennes, Naomie Harris, Bérénice Marlohe, Albert Finney, and Judi Dench. In the film, Bond investigates a series of targeted data leaks and co-ordinated attacks on MI6 led by Raoul Silva (Bardem).

Skyfall debuted in Royal Albert Hall on 23 October 2012, and was released on 26 October in the United Kingdom and on 9 November in the United States. Made on a production budget of $150–200million, Skyfall earned $1.109billion worldwide, finishing its theatrical run as the second-highest-grossing film of 2012, the seventh-highest-grossing film of all time, and Sony Pictures' highest-grossing film from December 2012 to August 2019. On the review aggregator website Rotten Tomatoes, the film holds an approval rating of  based on  reviews.

The film has received various awards and nominations. At the 85th Academy Awards, Skyfall received five Oscar nominations, and won for Best Original Song (for "Skyfall") and Best Sound Editing. The song received several Best Original Song awards, including from the Grammy Awards, the Golden Globe Awards, and the Critics' Choice Movie Awards. It won one of seven nominations at the 39th Saturn Awards.

Accolades

See also
 List of accolades received by No Time to Die

Notes

References

External links
 

Lists of accolades by film
James Bond lists
Sony-related lists